Edith Marie McClurg (born July 23, 1951) is an American actress and comedian. She has played supporting roles in the films Carrie (1976), Ferris Bueller's Day Off (1986), and Elvira: Mistress of the Dark (1988), and bit parts in Cheech and Chong's Next Movie (1980), Mr. Mom (1983), Back to School (1986), Planes, Trains and Automobiles (1987), A River Runs Through It (1992), Natural Born Killers (1994), and Flubber (1997).

On television, McClurg regularly performed on The David Letterman Show, before playing Bonnie Brindle in Small Wonder (1985–1987) and Mrs. Patty Poole on The Hogan Family (1986–1991). As a one-off character, she has appeared in Alice, Mr. Belvedere, The Golden Girls, Roseanne, Full House, Seinfeld, Sabrina the Teenage Witch, Malcolm in the Middle, Hannah Montana, Crashbox and Portlandia. Since 1977, she has also appeared in numerous commercials.

As a voice actress, McClurg has played in The Secret of NIMH (1982), The Little Mermaid (1989), A Bug's Life (1998), the first two films of the Cars franchise (2006-2011), and Wreck-It Ralph (2012), as well as in Snorks (1984–1988),  Life with Louie (1995–1998) and Violet Bleakman in Clifford the Big Red Dog (2000–2003).

Early life and education
McClurg was born and raised in Kansas City, Missouri, to Mac, a mailman, and Irene McClurg, an FAA secretary. She has an older brother, Bob, who is also an actor. McClurg attended the University of Missouri–Kansas City in the mid-1960s where she also taught radio for eight years. She earned a master's degree from Syracuse University.

At the University of Missouri–Kansas City, McClurg re-entered the entertainment field as a DJ, newswoman, and producer for the NPR affiliate KCUR-FM. There she portrayed John Ehrlichman in Conversation 26 of NPR's national broadcast of the Nixon Tape transcripts. It was at this university that Edie was awarded an honorary doctorate in 2017.

Career
McClurg's onscreen debut was as Helen Shyres in Brian De Palma's 1976 horror film Carrie starring Sissy Spacek. She was a comedy regular on the Tony Orlando and Dawn variety show (1976–1977) and then a cast member of The Kallikaks and The Richard Pryor Show.

In 1980, McClurg regularly performed on The David Letterman Show as Mrs. Marv Mendenhall. 

Having been a member of San Francisco's improv comedy the Pitcshel Players, she moved to Los Angeles and joined the Groundlings troupe.

She worked with fellow Groundling player Paul Reubens on his first play The Pee-wee Herman Show, in which she appeared in 1981 as "Hermit Hattie". She also appeared in the 1988 film Elvira: Mistress of the Dark with fellow Groundling player Cassandra Peterson, who appeared as her alter ego Elvira.

McClurg has appeared in almost 90 films and 55 television episodes, usually typecast as a middle-aged, somewhat stubborn, and dim-witted Midwesterner.

McClurg is known for a number of roles, including Mrs. Burns in A River Runs Through It, Grace in Ferris Bueller's Day Off, Lucille Tarlek on WKRP in Cincinnati, Lynn in She's Having a Baby, Willamae Jones in the television remake of Harper Valley PTA, Mrs. Patty Poole on The Hogan Family (originally "Valerie"), Bonnie Brindle on Small Wonder, Marge Sweetwater in Back to School, the car rental agent in Planes, Trains and Automobiles, Mrs. Violet Bleakman on Clifford the Big Red Dog, and Mrs. Beeker on 7th Heaven.

She guest starred as Barri's mother in an episode of Campus Ladies. She portrayed one of the wicked stepsisters in the Faerie Tale Theatre production "Cinderella." McClurg appeared on several game shows, including Match Game, The $25,000 Pyramid, Password Plus, and Super Password.

McClurg contributed assorted voices for The Jetsons, The Snorks, Life with Louie, A Bug's Life, Justin and the Knights of Valour, Cars and Cars 2.

She voiced Carlotta in The Little Mermaid, Mary in Wreck-It Ralph, Molly in Home on the Range, Miss Right in The Secret of NIMH, the Dragon in the Nightmare Ned video game, Barsa in Kiki's Delivery Service, Fran on Higglytown Heroes, the offscreen "Polite Female Voice" in the Revolting Slob segments on Crashbox, Mrs. Claus in Holidaze: The Christmas That Almost Didn't Happen, Grandma Taters in The Adventures of Jimmy Neutron: Boy Genius, Violet Stimpleton in Rocket Power, Bea's mother in Fish Hooks, Winnie Pig in Tiny Toon Adventures: How I Spent My Vacation, Bobby's teacher in Bobby's World and Trudi Traveler in an episode of Wander Over Yonder.

McClurg portrayed a nurse nicknamed "Angel of Death" in an episode of The Golden Girls. She also appeared in an episode of Hannah Montana as Cindy Merriweather. Continuing her passion for performing improvised comedy, McClurg is a player with Spolin Players. On April 9, 2007, she made an appearance on Thank God You're Here. In 2011, she appeared in an episode of the CBS sitcom Rules of Engagement.

In 2020, she made a cameo in the Family Guy episode "Holly Bibble" in a spoof of Ferris Bueller's Day Off. She appeared as 'Grace', personal assistant to [Carter as] Pontius Pilate. Immediately following the delivery of her lines, was the following acknowledgment by Carter/Pontius' character, "Wasn't that cool? That was really her! Edie McClurg. Thanks Edie!"

Personal life
In 2019, TMZ reported that family and friends of McClurg filed court documents requesting a conservatorship to manage her affairs. They said neurological tests provide evidence that McClurg is unable to live alone without assistance and is “especially vulnerable to undue influence, given her poor judgment and evident dementia.” TMZ further reported that a conservator, McClurg's cousin, Angelique Cabral, had been appointed.

In August 2022, the lawyer for the conservatorship filed court documents alleging that a man who had befriended and moved in with McClurg, becoming her caregiver, with the court's consent, was abusing McClurg. The documents allege she was sexually assaulted by her caregiver, and a police report had been filed with the LAPD. They further allege that the man tried to remove her from the state to marry her. The judge for the conservatorship granted an order of protection, with further hearings scheduled for September 2022.

Filmography

Film

Television

Television films

Additional credits
 The Paragon of Comedy (1983 – television special)
 Christmas Everyday (1986 – television special) 
 Tiny Toons Spring Break (1994 – television special)
 Life with Louie: A Christmas Surprise for Mrs. Stillman ... Ora Anderson (1994 – television short)
 Escape from Monkey Island ... Miss Rivers (2000 – video game)
 Stinky Pierre (2003 – television short)
 Tak 3: The Great Juju Challenge ... Stone Crusher (2005 – video game)
 Toot & Puddle: I'll Be Home for Christmas (2006 – direct-to video animated film)
 What's Wrong with Ruth ... Mother (2007 television short animation)
 The Outlaw Emmett Deemus ... Mary (2008 – short film)
 Stage Two ... Maggie's Mom (2008 – short film)
 The Not Goods Anthology: This Is Absolutely Not Good ... Herself (2010 – video short)
 dated. ... Edie (2011 – video short)
 Heal Thyself ... Doris Green (2012 – Short film)
 Curious George Swings Into Spring ... Lydia / Mom / Lady (2013 – video animation)
 The Gift ... Old Lady (2014 – short film)
 Eyes Upon Waking ... Nurse Jane (2014 – short film)
 How to Become an Outlaw (2014)

References

External links

 

1951 births
20th-century American actresses
21st-century American actresses
Living people
Actresses from Kansas City, Missouri
American film actresses
American musical theatre actresses
American stage actresses
American television actresses
American voice actresses
American women comedians
20th-century American comedians
21st-century American comedians
Comedians from Missouri
Syracuse University alumni
University of Missouri–Kansas City alumni